PCBA may refer to:

Printed Circuit Board Assembly
Punjab College of Business Administration
Pajoneer Corridor Basketball Association
Professional Chain Bangers Association